The Walking Dead is an American post-apocalyptic television series based on the comic book of the same name by Robert Kirkman, Tony Moore and Charlie Adlard, and developed for television by Frank Darabont. It premiered on the cable network AMC on October 31, 2010. The series focuses on Rick Grimes, a sheriff's deputy who slips into a coma after being shot. He awakens to find himself in a dangerous new world that has been overrun by "walkers". He joins a group of survivors (including his wife and son) as they try to survive in a world among the undead.

In October 2019, the series was renewed for an eleventh season. In September 2020, AMC confirmed that the eleventh season would be the series' last and would consist of 24 episodes broadcast from 2021 to 2022. The eleventh season premiered on August 22, 2021.

Series overview

Episodes

Season 1 (2010)

Season 2 (2011–12)

Season 3 (2012–13)

Season 4 (2013–14)

Season 5 (2014–15)

Season 6 (2015–16)

Season 7 (2016–17)

Season 8 (2017–18)

Season 9 (2018–19)

Season 10 (2019–21)

Season 11 (2021–22)

Specials 
A special titled "The Journey So Far" aired on October 16, 2016, as a recap of the first six seasons of The Walking Dead, featuring interviews with the cast and producers. It was watched by 2.18 million viewers.

Webisodes

Torn Apart (2011) 

Prior to the start of season 2, a six-episode web series called Torn Apart premiered on October 3, 2011, on AMC's official website. The web series is directed by special effects makeup artist and co-executive producer Greg Nicotero and tells the origin story of Hannah, also known as "Bicycle Girl", the walker that Rick Grimes killed out of mercy and whose bicycle he took in the first episode of the TV series.

Cold Storage (2012) 

A four-episode web series entitled Cold Storage was released on October 1, 2012. Set during the zombie apocalypse, Cold Storage follows the story of Chase as he seeks shelter in a storage facility under the command of B.J., a malicious former employee who hides a very dark secret. The storage unit Chase is given was owned by Rick Grimes.

The Oath (2013) 
A three-part webisode series, entitled The Oath, was released on October 1, 2013. This series tells the origin of the "Don't Open, Dead Inside" paint on the cafeteria doors of the hospital Rick Grimes awakes in, post-apocalypse. It follows Paul and Karina as they escape their zombie-overrun camp in search of a medical station. The central theme of the series examines the will to persevere in the face of inevitable death.

Red Machete (2017–18) 
A six-part webisode series entitled Red Machete first premiered on October 22, 2017. The web series tells the origin story of Rick Grimes's red machete. The series starred actors Jose Rosete, Anais Lilit, Sofia Esmaili, and Jeff Kober, reprising his role as Joe, the leader of the Claimers from the fourth season of The Walking Dead.

Ratings

References

External links 

 
 

Lists of American drama television series episodes
Lists of horror television series episodes